Tanacross Air Base is a former United States Army airfield located one nautical mile (2 km) south of the central business district of Tanacross, in the Southeast Fairbanks Census Area of the U.S. state of Alaska.

History
Constructed 1943, activated September 20 by Air Transport Command as Station #16, Alaskan Wing, later 1464th AAFBU. Alaskan Division, ATC. It was auxiliary to Ladd Army Airfield for Northwest Staging Route Lend-Lease aircraft. The facility was designated Tanacross Air Base in July 1944. Its mission was servicing Northwest Staging Route Lend-Lease aircraft from United States. The facility was transferred to Eleventh Air Force, then to Alaskan Air Command in 1945 and closed; it was turned over to War Assets Administration for disposition in 1946.  

Jurisdiction transferred to private ownership in 1947 and redeveloped as Tanacross Airport.  One of the hangars at the site later became the Big Dipper Ice Arena in Fairbanks.

See also

 Alaska World War II Army Airfields
 Air Transport Command
 Northwest Staging Route

References 

Airfields of the United States Army Air Forces Air Transport Command in Alaska
Airfields of the United States Army Air Forces in Alaska
Closed installations of the United States Army